Clepsis siciliana is a species of moth of the family Tortricidae. It is found in North Africa, France, Spain, Portugal and on Sicily.

The wingspan is 15–17 mm. Adults have been recorded on wing from June to July.

References

Moths described in 1894
Clepsis